Ayşe Adilşah Kadın ("the living one" or "womanly" and "fairness/justice of the Şah" or "Heart of the Şah''"; c. 1748 - 19 December 1803) was a consort of Ottoman Sultan Mustafa III.

Life
Of Circassian descent, Adilşah was the consort of Mustafa III. She was given the title of 'Third Consort'. On 13 January, 1766, she gave birth to her first child a daughter, Beyhan Sultan in the Topkapı Palace. Two years later, on 14 June 1768 she gave birth to her second child a daughter, Hatice Sultan in the Topkapı Palace. After the death of Mustafa in 1774, she and her daughters settled in the Old Palace. Due to the isolated environment, both her daughters developed symptoms of depression, anxiety, and other troubling behaviors. Adilşah then wrote to the new sultan, Abdülhamid I, half-brother of Mustafa III, to allow her daughters to marry, which would allow them to leave confinement in the Palace. The sultan granted her request and found husbands for the two princesses. 
 
She had two foundations in the VGM Archive, which are recorded in the book numbered K.171. In her original foundation, dated 1795, it is seen that she devoted the mosque she had built in Istanbul, determined the officers of the mosque, the services they will do and their wages. She also devoted three large farms and a plot of trees and buildings to constitute the income of the foundation. In the zeyl foundation, dated 1797, there are provisions regarding the reorganization of the foundation's trustees.

After her death, her daughter Beyhan Sultan built a school in the vicinity of Yeşilioğlu Palace, opposite of Hatice Sultan Palace in the memory of her mother. In 1805, Hatice Sultan built Adilşah Kadın Mosque in her memory.

The mosque was located in a large and embankment site surrounded by a uniform wall. On the other hand, the primary school in her name was on the opposite side of the courtyard in front of the Tekfur Palace, adjacent to the Şişehane, and was made of wood.

Death
Adilşah Kadın died on 19 December 1803 during the month of Ramadan and was buried in Mustafa III Mausoleum, Laleli Mosque, Istanbul.

Issue
Together with Mustafa, Adilşah had two daughters:
 Beyhan Sultan (Topkapı Palace, 13 January 1766 – Istanbul, 7 November 1824, buried in Mihrişah Sultan Mausoleum, Eyüp), married with issue;
 Hatice Sultan (Topkapı Palace, 14 June 1768 – Istanbul, 17 July 1822, buried in Mihrişah Sultan Mausoleum, Eyüp), married with issue;

See also
Ottoman Imperial Harem
List of consorts of the Ottoman sultans

References

Sources

18th-century births
1803 deaths
People from the Ottoman Empire of Circassian descent
18th-century consorts of Ottoman sultans
19th-century consorts of Ottoman sultans